Jim or Jimmy Williams may refer to:

Sports

American football 
Jim Williams (American football, born 1928) (1928–1989), American football coach
Jimmy Williams (linebacker) (born 1960), American football linebacker
Jimmy Williams (cornerback, born 1979) (1979–2022), American football cornerback
Jimmy Williams (cornerback, born 1984) (born 1984), American football cornerback

Association football (soccer) 
Jimmy Williams (footballer, born 1882) (1882–1960), English footballer
Jimmy Williams (footballer, born 1888) (1888–1951), English footballer (Stoke City)
Jimmy Williams (footballer, born 1982), English footballer

Baseball 
Jim Williams (outfielder, born 1906), American outfielder in the Negro leagues from 1931 to 1944
Jim Williams (outfielder, born 1947), American outfielder in MLB from 1969 to 1970
Jimmy Williams (coach) (1926–2016), Canadian minor-league player and manager; Baltimore Orioles first base coach from 1981 to 1987
Jimmy Williams (manager) (1847–1918), American baseball manager in the 1880s
Jimmy Williams (second baseman) (1876–1965), American second baseman in MLB from 1899 to 1909
Jimy Williams (born 1943), American infielder, coach, and manager (Blue Jays, Red Sox, Astros) in MLB

Basketball 
Jim Williams (basketball) (1915–2007), head basketball coach at Colorado State University from 1954 to 1980
Jimmy Williams (basketball coach), assistant basketball coach at University of Memphis, University of Minnesota, and Oklahoma State; interim head coach at Minnesota (1985–86)
Jimmy Williams (basketball player) (born 1986), Togolese basketball player

Other sports 
Jim Williams (curler) (1915–1987) Canadian curler
Jimmy Williams (rugby league), rugby league footballer of the 1920s
Jim Williams (powerlifter) (1940–2007) American powerlifter
Jim Williams (darts player) (born 1984), Welsh darts player
Jim Williams (rugby union) (born 1968), Munster forwards coach and ex-player

Other people
Jim Williams (author) (born 1947), author and lawyer
Jim Williams (analog designer) (1948–2011), analog circuit designer and technical author
Jim Williams (news anchor) (born 1957), news anchor at WBBM-TV in Chicago
Jim Williams (composer), Music for Hotel Babylon
Jim Williams (militia leader) (circa 1830–1871), African-American soldier and militia leader
Jim Williams (pastor) (1935–2015), AoG pastor from New Zealand
Jim Williams (politician) (1926–2016), American politician
James Arthur Williams, person popularized in the 1994 book Midnight in the Garden of Good and Evil
Jimmy Williams (Neighbours), a character from the Australian soap opera Neighbours

See also
James Williams (disambiguation)